Elena Todorova (born 1 July 1994) is a Bulgarian group rhythmic gymnast.

Career
She represented her nation at international competitions. She participated at the 2012 Summer Olympics in London. She also competed at world championships, including at the 2011 World Rhythmic Gymnastics Championships.

References

External links

1994 births
Living people
Bulgarian rhythmic gymnasts
Place of birth missing (living people)
Gymnasts at the 2012 Summer Olympics
Olympic gymnasts of Bulgaria
Medalists at the Rhythmic Gymnastics World Championships
Medalists at the Rhythmic Gymnastics European Championships